Dracaena cinnabari, the Socotra dragon tree or dragon blood tree, is a dragon tree native to the Socotra archipelago, part of Yemen, located in the Arabian Sea. It is named after the blood-like color of the red sap that the trees produce.

Description

The dragon blood tree has a unique and strange appearance, with an "upturned, densely packed crown having the shape of an uprightly held umbrella". This evergreen species is named after its dark red resin, which is known as "dragon's blood". Unlike most monocot plants, Dracaena displays secondary growth, D. cinnabari even has growth zones resembling tree rings found in dicot tree species. Along with other arborescent Dracaena species it has a distinctive growth habit called "dracoid ". Its leaves are found only at the end of its youngest branches; its leaves are all shed every 3 or 4 years before new leaves simultaneously mature. Branching tends to occur when the growth of the terminal bud is stopped, due to either flowering or traumatic events (e.g. herbivory).

Its fruits are small fleshy berries containing between 1 and 4 seeds. As they develop they turn from green to black, and then become orange when ripe. The berries are eaten by birds (e.g. Onychognatus species) and thereby dispersed. The seeds are 4–5 mm in diameter and weigh on average 68 mg. The berries exude a deep red resin, known as dragon's blood.

Like other monocotyledons, such as palms, the dragon's blood tree grows from the tip of the stem, with the long, stiff leaves borne in dense rosettes at the end (4, 5, 7). It branches at maturity to produce an umbrella-shaped crown, with leaves that measure up to 60 cm long and 3 cm wide. The trunk and the branches of the dragon blood are thick and stout and display dichotomous branching, where each of the branches repeatedly divides into two sections.

Biology
The dragon's blood tree usually produces its flowers around March, though flowering does vary with location. The flowers tend to grow at the end of the branches. The plants have inflorescences and bear small clusters of fragrant, white, or green flowers. The fruits take five months to completely mature. The fruits are described as a fleshy berry, which changes from green to black as it gradually ripens. The fleshy berry fruit ends up being an orange-red color that contains one to three seeds. The berries are usually eaten and dispersed by birds and other animals.

The different shape of the dragon's blood tree is an adaptation for survival in arid conditions with low amounts of soil, such as in mountaintops. The large, packed crown provides shade and reduces evaporation. This shade also aids in the survival of seedlings growing beneath the adult tree, explaining why the trees tend to grow closer together.

Taxonomy 
The first description of D. cinnabari was made during a survey of Socotra led by Lieutenant Wellsted of the East India Company in 1835. It was first named Pterocarpus draco, but in 1880, the Scottish botanist Isaac Bayley Balfour made a formal description of the species and renamed it as Dracaena cinnabari. Of between 60 and 100 Dracaena species, D. cinnabari is one of only six species that grow as a tree.

Evolution 
Along with other plants on Socotra, D. cinnabari is thought to have derived from the Tethyan flora. It is considered a remnant of the Mio-Pliocene Laurasian subtropical forests that are now almost extinct due to the extensive desertification of North Africa.

Conservation

Threats

Although most of its ecological habitats are still intact, there is an increasing population with industrial and tourism development. This is putting more pressure on the vegetation through the process of logging, overgrazing, woodcutting and infrastructure of development plans. Though the dragon's blood tree is highly widespread, it has become fragmented due to the development that has occurred in its habitats. Many of its populations are suffering due to poor regeneration. Human activities have greatly reduced the dragon's blood population through overgrazing, and feeding the flowers and fruits to the livestock of the island. One of the species' greatest threats is the gradual drying out of the Socotra Archipelago, which has been an ongoing process for the last few hundred years. This has resulted in non-flourishing trees, and the duration of the mist and cloud around the area seems to also be decreasing. Increasing arid environments is predicted to cause a 45 percent reduction in the available habitat for D. cinnabari by the year 2080.

Additional threats to the dragon's blood tree include harvesting of its resin and use of the leaves to make rope. Presently some of the dragon's blood trees have been used to make beehives. This was generally prohibited; this displays how the species may be threatened by a breakdown in the traditional practices of the island.

The best preserved and largest stand of D. cinnabari is on the limestone plateau named Rokeb di Firmihin. This approximately  forest has numerous rare and endemic species. Research shows that in coming decades the number of trees in this forest will decrease due to the lack of natural regeneration.

Management
The unique flora and fauna of the Socotra Archipelago are in a World Heritage Site and a Global 200 ecoregion. It is a Centre of Plant Diversity and an Endemic Bird Area. It also lies within the Horn of Africa biodiversity hotspot. There are multiple efforts that are being developed to help create and support a sustainable habitat and biodiversity management programs on Socotra. The dragon's blood tree is considered as an important species for commodity and for conservation efforts on the island. The dragon's blood falls under an umbrella species. This is a species selected for making conservation related decisions, typically because protecting these species indirectly protects the many other species that make up the ecological community of its habitat. Species conservation can be subjective because it is difficult to determine the status of many species. Thus, the dragons blood protection efforts would also benefit many other plants and animals within the area.

The dragon's blood tree is given some protection from international commercial trade under the listing of all Dracaena species on Appendix II of CITES (3), but if its populations are to be effectively preserved, a variety of measures will need to be taken. These include urgent monitoring of the species' natural regeneration and the expansion of Skund Nature Sanctuary to cover important areas of the habitats. Also, efforts to avoid road construction in the dragon blood's habitat, and limit grazing need to be brought to attention. Additional conservation efforts for the tree involve fencing against livestock, watering of seedlings in open areas, and involving local communities in planting seedlings.

By the 21st century threats arising from global warming and over grazing has made it difficult for new dragon blood trees to grow in wild. A collaboration of local people with assistance from others such as UK based 'Friends of Socotra' and Mendel University has been aiding a number of slow growing saplings by watering them while they are too young to draw down sufficient water, and protecting them from hungry goats. As of 2022, about 600 saplings have reached the point where they no longer need regular watering, leading to hopes that a new generation of the tree may become established on Socotra.

Uses
Dragon's blood is used as a stimulant and abortifacient. The root yields a gum-resin, used in gargle water as a stimulant, astringent and in toothpaste. The root is used in rheumatism, the leaves are a carminative.

The trees can be harvested for their crimson red resin, called dragon's blood, which was highly prized in the ancient world and is still used today. Around the Mediterranean basin it is used as a dye and as a medicine, Socotrans use it ornamentally as well as dyeing wool, gluing pottery, a breath freshener, and lipstick. Because of the belief that it is the blood of the dragon it is also used in ritual magic and alchemy. In 1883, the Scottish botanist Isaac Bayley Balfour identified three grades of resin: the most valuable were tear-like in appearance, then a mixture of small chips and fragments, with a mixture of fragments and debris being the cheapest. The resin of D. cinnabari is thought to have been the original source of dragon's blood until during the medieval and renaissance periods when other plants were used instead.

The local inhabitants of the city in the Socotra Island use the dragon's blood resin as a cure-all. Greeks, Romans, and Arabs use it in general wound healing, as a coagulant, cure for diarrhea, for dysentery diseases, for lowering fevers. It is also taken for ulcers in the mouth, throat, intestines and stomach.

Dragon's blood from D. cinnabari was used as a source of varnish for 18th-century Italian violin-makers. It was also used as tooth-paste in the 18th century. It is still used as varnish for violins and for photoengraving. Dragon's blood is also listed in a 16th-century text, Stahel und Eyssen, as an ingredient in a quenching bath for tempering steel. However this text is vague and poorly regarded as either an accurate description of smith's practice, or as a viable recipe.

References

Sources

Eggli, U. (2001) Illustrated Handbook of Succulent Plants: Monocotyledons. Springer-Verlag, Berlin.
Pearson, J. (2002) Dragons blood. The Horticulturalist, 11(2): 10–12.
Attorre, F., Francesconi, F., Taleb, N., Scholte, P., Saed, A., Alfo, M. and Bruno, F. (2007) Will dragonblood survive the next period of climate change? Current and future potential distribution of Dracaena cinnabari (Socotra, Yemen)" Biological Conservation 138: 430-439.
Heywood, V.H. (1978) Flowering Plants of the World. Oxford University Press, Oxford.
Gupta, D., Bleakley, B. and Gupta, R.K. (2008) Dragon’s blood: botany, chemistry and therapeutic uses" Journal of Ethnopharmacology 115: 361-380.
UNEP-WCMC: Socotra Archipelago, Yemen

External links

cinnabari
Endemic flora of Socotra
Plants described in 1882
Plant dyes
Taxa named by Isaac Bayley Balfour